The 2014 Junior League World Series took place from August 9–16 in Taylor, Michigan, United States. Taichung, Taiwan defeated Corpus Christi, Texas in the championship game. It was Taiwan's second straight championship.

Teams

Results

United States Pool

International Pool

Elimination Round

References

Junior League World Series
Junior League World Series